James Hugh Ward (November 30, 1853 – August 15, 1916) was a U.S. Representative from Illinois.

Biography
Born in Chicago, Illinois, Ward attended the public schools of Chicago and graduated from the University of Notre Dame in Indiana in 1873.
He attended the Union College of Law in Chicago, and was graduated in 1876.
He was admitted to the bar in July 1876, and practiced.
He was elected supervisor of the town of West Chicago in 1879.

Ward was elected as a Democrat to the Forty-ninth Congress (March 4, 1885 – March 3, 1887).
He did not seek renomination in 1886.
He resumed the practice of his profession in Chicago, Illinois where he died on August 15, 1916.
He was interred in Calvary Cemetery.

References

1853 births
1916 deaths
Politicians from Chicago
University of Notre Dame alumni
Northwestern University Pritzker School of Law alumni
Democratic Party members of the United States House of Representatives from Illinois
19th-century American politicians
Burials at Calvary Cemetery (Evanston, Illinois)